WVEK-FM is a classic hits formatted broadcast radio station licensed to Weber City, Virginia, serving the Tri-Cities area.  WVEK-FM is owned and operated by Glenwood Communications Corporation, through subsidiary Holston Valley Broadcasting Corporation.

History
WVEK went on the air as WSEH on July 26, 1991 and was owned by Cumberland City Broadcasting.

On May 26, 2005, WSEH switched its calls to WVEK-FM and its format to classic rock.  Five days later on May 31, 2005, the station was sold to Regina Kay Moore, who owned nearby WJNV.

On June 27, 2008, Moore began the process to sell WVEK-FM to Holston Valley Broadcasting Corporation of Kingsport, Tennessee.  The sale of the station would be "consummated" on July 16, 2008.

On July 28, 2008, WVEK-FM fell silent ahead of its move to Weber City, Virginia.  WVEK-FM returned to the air on August 21, 2008 with classic hits.

References

External links
The Tri-Cities Classic Hits 102-7 Online

VEK-FM
Radio stations established in 1991
Classic hits radio stations in the United States